Nikita Bolozin (born 14 December 1994) is a Russian rower.

He won a medal at the 2019 World Rowing Championships.

References

External links

1994 births
Living people
Russian male rowers
World Rowing Championships medalists for Russia